Federal Highway 172 (Carretera Federal 172) is a Federal Highway of Mexico. The highway travels from Minatitlán, Veracruz in the west to Coatzacoalcos, Veracruz in the east. Federal Highway 172 serves as a bypass of Mexican Federal Highway 180 in Coatzacoalcos and is also the route leading from Minatitlán city proper to Minatitlán/Coatzacoalcos International Airport.

References

172